Parliamentary elections were held in Norway on 19 October 1936, the last before World War II and the German invasion of Norway. The result was a victory for the Labour Party, which won 70 of the 150 seats in the Storting.

During the election campaign, the conservative and liberal parties ran on the slogan "A free people in a free Norway." They argued that a Labour Party victory would lead to terrorism, dictatorship, and Marxism. A prominent controversial topic during the election campaign was the decision of the Labour government to allow Leon Trotsky to take up a domicile in Norway in 1935.

Results

Seat distribution

Notes

References

General elections in Norway
1930s elections in Norway
Norway
Parliamentary
Norway